SAS Ground Handling is Europe's third-largest full-service provider of aircraft ground handling and airport related services. SAS Ground Handling is the largest ground-handling company in Scandinavia.

History 
As of July 1, 2010 SAS Ground Services is renamed to SAS Ground Handling. SAS Ground Handling serves more than 30 airports in Denmark, Norway and Sweden and has about 8.400 employees. SAS Ground Handling is owned by the SAS Group.

As part of the Core-SAS strategy formed by the SAS Group in February 2009, some of SAS Ground Handling operations are being divested or outsourced.

SAS Ground Services Finland was divested to ISS Palvelut in July 2009.
SAS Ground Services UK was divested to ASIG in June 2010.
On March 7, 2013 Swissport International Ltd. (“Swissport”) and Scandinavian Airline Systems (“SAS”) announced that they signed a Letter of Intent creating the basis for continued negotiations between the two companies, aiming at an agreement to transfer full ownership of SAS Ground Handling in Denmark, Sweden and Norway to Swissport. As a first step, both parties intend to establish a joint venture company to which the business and operations of SAS Ground Handling and Spirit (cargo handling) will be transferred.

As of September 1, 2013 SAS Ground Handling was divided into three divisions, SGH Norway, SGH Sweden and SGH Denmark, respectively, in preparation for the planned sale to Swissport. At the same time, Swissport, in according to the Letter of Intent, have bought 10% shares in each of these three divisions, while negotiations still continue.

In May 2016 SAS, however, announced its intentions to retain control of the operations at main airports.

Major customers

 Aeroflot
 airBaltic
 Air Canada
 Air China
 Air Europa
 Air France
 Atlantic Airways
 Austrian Airlines
 Balkan Holidays Airlines
 British Airways
 Condor
 Corendon Airlines
 Corsairfly
 Cyprus Turkish Airlines
 Czech Airlines
 Danish Air Transport
 FedEx Express
 Freebird Airlines
 Icelandair
 Iran Air
 LOT Polish Airlines
 Lufthansa
 Lufthansa Cargo
 Norwegian Air Shuttle
 Nouvelair
 Novair
 Pakistan International Airlines
 Pegasus Airlines
 Ryanair
 SAS Scandinavian Airlines
 Singapore Airlines
 South African Airways
 Sun d'Or International Airlines
 SunExpress
 TAP Air Portugal
 Thai Airways International
 Thomas Cook Airlines Scandinavia
 TNT Airways
 Tunisair
 Turkish Airlines
 Widerøe

References

External links

SAS Group
Business services companies of Norway
Aircraft ground handling companies